Namibia–Spain relations are the bilateral and diplomatic relations between these two countries. Namibia is accredited to Spain from its embassy in Paris, France. Spain has an embassy in Windhoek.

Diplomatic relations 
Formal diplomatic relations began in 1990, the year in which Spain opened an Embassy in Windhoek, and they have been very good to date. Among the EU countries, Namibian authorities look to Spain with special affection. Spain was part of UNTAG (UN operation responsible for ensuring the transition from a situation of colonialism and "apartheid" to the holding of free elections), sending a detachment of the Air Force and eight aircraft to Namibia. 

Despite the years that have passed, this support has not been forgotten. The former President of SWAPO and Founding Father of the Republic, Sam Nujoma, visited Spain in 1996. The Kings returned the visit in 1999. Since then there have been several high-level trips and visits, the last of which was made by the Namibian Minister Foreign Affairs to Spain in 2013.

Economic relations 
Traditionally, Spain's interest in the Namibian market focused almost exclusively on the exploitation of the African country's fisheries for which important investments were made in the sector. In recent years, however, there has been growing interest on the part of Spanish companies in different Namibian sectors: renewable energy, infrastructure, oil.

Cooperation 
The relations of cooperation for the development of Spain with Namibia began at the same time of the independence of the country with the opening of a Technical Cooperation Office (OTC) of the then AECI in Windhoek.

For many years, Namibia was a priority country for our cooperation, but the IV Master Plan for Spanish Cooperation 2013-2016 included Namibia among the 9 countries of Sub-Saharan Africa where it was planned to close or redesign the current program. As a result, the OTC in Windhoek closed its doors in August 2015.

The overall volume of official development assistance (ODA) received by Namibia fluctuated greatly in recent years. In the 1990s, after independence, the volume of foreign aid received doubled, with a rapid decline after the first years of the new millennium. Between 2007 and 2010 there was an uptick in ODA granted to the country, to decrease again considerably from 2011. During the period 2005-2012 the total net ODA of Spain in the country reached 72 million euros, mostly channeled to through bilateral programs of AECID and MAEC (49 million) and contributions to multilateral organizations (10 million).

Despite the closure of the OTC, Spanish cooperation is still present in Namibia through the Spanish lecturer at UNAM and other regional programs (with the African Union and with NEPAD) and multilateral. Other institutions, such as the CETMAR Foundation, maintain cooperation activities
with Namibia

See also  
 Foreign relations of Namibia 
 Foreign relations of Spain

References 

 
Spain
Namibia